Interferon-induced 35 kDa protein is a protein that in humans is encoded by the IFI35 gene.

Interactions 

IFI35 has been shown to interact with NMI and BATF.

References

Further reading

External links 
 

Transcription factors